Andrzej Macur (born 1 February 1959) is a Polish sports shooter. He competed in the mixed 25 metre rapid fire pistol event at the 1980 Summer Olympics.

References

1959 births
Living people
Polish male sport shooters
Olympic shooters of Poland
Shooters at the 1980 Summer Olympics
People from Zielona Góra